Christian Claus (born 2 May 1960) is an Austrian sailor. He competed in the Tornado event at the 1988 Summer Olympics.

References

External links
 

1960 births
Living people
Austrian male sailors (sport)
Olympic sailors of Austria
Sailors at the 1988 Summer Olympics – Tornado
People from Grebenstein
Sportspeople from Kassel (region)